Love Will Have Its Day is the second album from Laura Hackett Park. Forerunner Music released the project on October 21, 2014. Hackett Park worked with Brown Bannister and Ben Shive in the production of this album.

Critical reception

Specifying in a four star review by CCM Magazine, Andrew Greer recognizes, "A wellkept secret should be well-kept no longer." Kristen Gilles, indicating for Worship Leader in a four star review, realizes, the album "explores a broad range of music for personal reflection and worship." Signaling in a four and a half star review from New Release Tuesday, Kevin Davis responds, "This album soothes, moves and challenges listeners. Love Will Have its Day is a profound listening experience." Tony Cummings, designating the album a nine out of ten, grasps, "So throughout Laura's crystal clear voice and songs which exude personal experience as well as intense devotion to the living God make for a hugely memorable album." Awarding the album four stars at 365 Days of Inspiring Media, Joshua Andre writes, "Laura’s album is so rich lyrically, and deserves a thorough listen." Rating the album five stars by Louder Than the Music, Jono Davies says, "This is a top top album from a top top artist." Christian St. John, awarding the album four stars at Christian Review Magazine, writes, "Laura has a beautiful voice and it shines" on this "excellent release".

Accolades
This album was No. 13 on the Worship Leader's Top 20 Albums of 2014 list.

Track listing

Charts

References

2014 albums
Laura Hackett Park albums
Albums produced by Brown Bannister